Mike De La Torre (born September 22, 1986) is an American mixed martial artist, who competes as a featherweight.

Mixed martial arts career
De La Torre began training in mixed martial arts in 2005, and made his professional debut in 2006 at the age of 19, competing primarily for regional promotions across the Southwestern United States and Mexico.  

After getting his first six victories by way of stoppage in the first round, De La Torre was able to compile a record of 12 - 3 along the way before signing with the UFC in April 2014.  He signed with the organization on the heels of a submission finish over Cameron Ramberg.

Ultimate Fighting Championship
De La Torre made his promotional debut on April 16, 2014 at The Ultimate Fighter: Nations Finale. against Mark Bocek. He was tabbed as a short notice injury replacement for Evan Dunham Bocek won the back and forth fight via split decision.

De La Torre faced Brian Ortega on July 26, 2014 at UFC on Fox 12.  Ortega originally won the bout via submission (rear-naked choke) in the first round. Subsequently, the result was changed to "No Contest" after Ortega tested positive for drostanolone during a post fight screening.

De La Torre was briefly linked to a fight with Mark Eddiva on November 8, 2014 at UFC Fight Night 55.  However, the fight was scrapped as both fighters were subsequently injured during training.

De La Torre faced Tiago Trator on February 22, 2015 at UFC Fight Night 61.  De La Torre won the fight via TKO in the first round.  

De La Torre faced Maximo Blanco on July 12, 2015 at The Ultimate Fighter 21 Finale. He lost the fight via TKO in the first round.

De La Torre faced Yui Chul Nam on November 28, 2015 at UFC Fight Night 79. He won the fight via split decision.

De La Torre was expected to face Renato Moicano on September 24, 2016 at UFC Fight Night 95. However, Moicano pulled out with injury and was replaced by Godofredo Pepey. He lost the fight via submission in the first round.

De La Torre faced Myles Jury on April 8, 2017 at UFC 210. He lost the fight via TKO in the first round.

In May 2017, De La Torre was released from the company.

Mixed martial arts record

|-
|Loss
|align=center|14–7 (1)
|Myles Jury
|TKO (punches)
|UFC 210
|
|align=center|1
|align=center|3:30
|Buffalo, New York, United States
|
|-
|Loss
|align=center|14–6 (1) 
|Godofredo Pepey
| Submission (rear-naked choke)
|UFC Fight Night: Cyborg vs. Lansberg
|
|align=center| 1
|align=center| 3:03
|Brasília, Brazil
|  
|-
|Win
|align=center|14–5 (1)
|Yui Chul Nam
|Decision (split)
|UFC Fight Night: Henderson vs. Masvidal
|
|align=center|3
|align=center|5:00
|Seoul, South Korea
|   
|-
|Loss
|align=center|13–5 (1)
|Maximo Blanco
|TKO (punches)
|The Ultimate Fighter: American Top Team vs. Blackzilians Finale 
|
|align=center|1
|align=center|0:16
|Las Vegas, Nevada, United States
|
|-
|Win
| align=center|13–4 (1)
| Tiago Trator
| TKO (punches)
| UFC Fight Night: Bigfoot vs. Mir
| 
| align=center|1
| align=center|2:59
| Porto Alegre, Brazil
| 
|-
|NC
| align=center|12–4 (1)
| Brian Ortega
| NC (overturned) 
| UFC on Fox: Lawler vs. Brown
| 
| align=center|1
| align=center|1:39
| San Jose, California, United States
|
|-
| Loss
|align=center|12–4 
| Mark Bocek
| Decision (split)
| The Ultimate Fighter Nations Finale: Bisping vs. Kennedy
| 
|align=center|3
|align=center|5:00 
|Quebec City, Quebec, Canada
|
|-
| Win
|align=center|12–3
| Cameron Ramberg
| Submission (reverse triangle choke)
| Dakota FC 17
| 
|align=center|3
|align=center|1:03
| Fargo, North Dakota, United States
|
|-
| Win
|align=center|11–3
| James Terry
| Submission (rear-naked choke)
| Arise FC
| 
|align=center|1
|align=center|0:57
| Santa Clara, California, United States
| 
|-
|  Win
|align=center|10–3 
| Jordan Delano
| TKO (punches)
| XFS - Damage
| 
|align=center|1
|align=center|1:16
| Valley Center, California, United States
| 
|-
| Loss
|align=center|9–3
| Kris Armbrister
| Submission (triangle choke)
| XFS - Brutal Conduct
| 
|align=center|2
|align=center|2:55
| Valley Center, California, United States
| 
|-
| Win
|align=center|9–2
| Donald Molinas
| Submission (rear-naked choke)
| NFC - 11
| 
|align=center|1
|align=center|0:36
| Campo, California, United States
| 
|-
| Win
|align=center|8–2
| Fabian Quintanar
| TKO (elbows)
| UWC Mexico - 7
| 
|align=center|2
|align=center|3:42
| Tijuana, Mexico
| 
|-
| Win
|align=center|7–2
| Henry Briones
| Decision (unanimous)
| UCM 12
| 
|align=center|5
|align=center|5:00
| Tijuana, Mexico
|
|-
| Loss
|align=center|6–2
| Joshua Williams
| Submission (rear-naked choke)
| Total Combat 30
| 
|align=center|2
|align=center|1:52
| Alpine, California, United States
|
|-
| Win
|align=center|6–1
| Preston Scharf
| Submission (rear-naked choke)
| Total Combat Nevada
| 
|align=center|1
|align=center|1:36
| Laughlin, Nevada, United States
|
|-
| Win
|align=center|5–1
| Jason Meadors
| Submission (injury)
| Total Combat 26
| 
|align=center|1
|align=center|0:39
| San Diego, California, United States
|
|-
| Win
|align=center|4–1
| Noel Rodriguez
| KO (punch)
| MMAX - 18
| 
|align=center|1
|align=center|0:41
| Tijuana, Mexico
|
|-
| Loss
|align=center|3–1
| Zach Taylor
| Submission (triangle choke)
| Total Combat 25
| 
|align=center|1
|align=center|3:56
| San Diego, California, United States
|
|-
| Win
|align=center|3–0
| Enrique Cuellar
| Submission (armbar) 
| MMAX 9
| 
|align=center|1
|align=center|0:00
| Tijuana, Mexico
|
|-
| Win
|align=center|2–0
| James Ortega
| KO (punches)
| Total Combat 17
| 
|align=center|1
|align=center|0:00
| Yuma, Arizona, United States
|
|-
| Win
|align=center|1–0
| Isaac Peralta
| KO (punch)
| MMAX 4
| 
|align=center|1
|align=center|0:08
| Tijuana, Mexico
|

See also
 List of current UFC fighters
 List of male mixed martial artists

References

External links
Official UFC Profile

American male mixed martial artists
Featherweight mixed martial artists
Mixed martial artists utilizing Brazilian jiu-jitsu
Living people
1986 births
Ultimate Fighting Championship male fighters
American practitioners of Brazilian jiu-jitsu